The 75th Infantry Regiment (Ranger) (officially 75th Infantry Regiment or 75th Infantry) was initially a parent regiment for all the US Army Ranger units during the Vietnam War and the early 1980s and then the headquarters for the Ranger battalions.

History
On 1 February 1969, as part of the U.S. Army Combat Arms Regimental System (CARS), all U.S. Army Long Range Reconnaissance Patrol (LRRP) units were reorganized as the 75th Infantry Regiment (Ranger). Fifteen Ranger companies were formed from reconnaissance units in Europe and Vietnam with lineage to Merrill's Marauders (5307th Composite Unit). The firms were given the letters C through I and K through P. To avoid confusion with the similar "I" (or India) designation on typed documents, there was no "J" Ranger Company. Companies A and B were kept stateside as a strategic reserve in case they were needed overseas in Europe or the Americas.

The Ranger companies were composed of small, heavily armed long range reconnaissance teams that patrolled deep in enemy-held territory. Each independent company was attached to a separate division or brigade and acted as the eyes and ears of those units. Rangers collected intelligence, discovered enemy troop locations, surveilled trails and enemy hot spots, directed artillery and air strikes, performed bomb damage assessments, and conducted ambushes. Additionally, Rangers attempted to recover prisoners of war, capture enemy soldiers for interrogation, tap the wire communications of the North Vietnam Army and the National Liberation Front for South Vietnam (Vietcong) on the Ho Chi Minh trail, and mine enemy trails and roads.

Lineage

Organized as 5307th Composite Unit (Provisional) on 3 October 1943
Consolidated with the 475th Infantry and unit designated as 475th Infantry on 10 August 1944
Inactivated on 1 July 1945

Redesignated as 75th Infantry on 21 June 1954
Allotted to the Regular Army on 26 October 1954
Activated on 20 November 1954
Inactivated on 21 March 1956

Reorganized as a parent regiment under the Combat Arms Regimental System on 1 January 1969
Reorganized with Headquarters on 1 July 1984

On 3 February 1986, the 75th Infantry Regiment (then consisting of Headquarters and Headquarters Company, 1st Ranger Battalion, 2nd Ranger Battalion, and 3rd Ranger Battalion) was consolidated with the former A Company, 1st Ranger Infantry Battalion (then part of HHC 7th SFG), Company A, 2nd Infantry Battalion (then part of HHC 10th SFG), and the inactive units Company A, 3rd Ranger Infantry Battalion (last part of HHC 13th SFG, inactivated in 1966), 4th Ranger Battalion, 5th Ranger Battalion and 6th Ranger Battalion; it was concurrently designated as 75th Ranger Regiment and reorganized under the Regimental System.

Organization

Vietnam War 

When they were redesignated on 1 February 1969, the average TOE strength of a Ranger company was of 3 officers and 115 enlisted men, bringing the total to 118 men divided into a company headquarters, operations section, communications platoon, and two patrol platoons.

There were some exceptions though; Company C, 75th Infantry (Ranger) had a strength of 230 men divided into a company Headquarters, operations section, communications platoon, and four patrol platoons.

Companies D and H each had 198 men and Companies M, N, O, and P each had 61 men, since these four units were created from LRP detachments assigned to brigades.

Ranger Companies

Post-Vietnam reorganization

Battalions

See also
 Company F, 425th Infantry (Ranger)

References

External links
 75th Ranger Regiment lineage 

Military units and formations of the United States Army in the Vietnam War
Military units and formations established in 1969
United States Army Rangers regiments
Military units and formations disestablished in 1986